Knievel is a surname of German origin. Notable people with the surname include:

Evel Knievel (1938–2007), American stuntman and daredevil
Robbie Knievel (1962–2023), American daredevil, son of Evel

See also
Evel Knievel (disambiguation)

German-language surnames